Waleed Muhammed Sadi (August 19, 1939 – October 7, 2019) was a Jordanian ambassador.

Career
He was editor for the Jordan Times and continues to write a column on human rights for the newspaper.
He was head of the Jordanian Delegation to the ICC Conference in Rome, Chairperson of the ICC's Working Group on Crimes against Humanity
he represented the Jordanian government in New York City, Washington, D.C., Moscow, London and Paris.
From 1975 to 1981 he was Permanent Representative next the United Nations Office at Geneva..
From 1982 to 1985 he was Ambassador in Ankara.
From 1980 to 1981 he was Chairman of the Commission on Human Rights.
From 1978 to 1982, and from 1990 to 1994 he was Member of the Human Rights Committee.
In 1998 he was Head of the delegation of Jordan to the United Nations Diplomatic Conference of Plenipotentiaries on the Establishment of an International Criminal Court in Rome.
From 2003 to 2006 he was Chairman of the Working Group on Crimes against Humanity Commissioner-General National Centre for Human Rights in Amman.

References

1939 births
Living people
Permanent Representatives of Jordan to the United Nations
Ambassadors of Jordan to Turkey